Vexillum ochraceum is a species of small sea snail, marine gastropod mollusk in the family Costellariidae, the ribbed miters.

Description
The length of the shell attains 9.2 mm.

Distribution
This marine species occurs off New Caledonia.

References

ochraceum
Gastropods described in 1897